Freelance diplomacy is a form of self-financing diplomatic representation used by countries who as a general rule, could not afford to hire expert diplomatic consultants full-time.

A "freelance diplomat" is hired for a specific task or may sometimes be contracted on a permanent basis to run a delegation, mission or embassy. They may also used to promote investment into the country they work for.  It is understood to be a performance-based relationship, where the diplomat is paid on results only.

Prominent freelance diplomats include.

Carne Ross, former British diplomat.
Jimmy Carter, former President of the United States.

References

External links 
Top "Diplomat for Hire" to visit Bucharest
Freelance Diplomats Lend A Hand To Would-Be States
Trade Commissioner Colin Evans outlines crucial diplomatic strategies
Diplomat Colin Evans Big Success with European Investors

Types of diplomacy